This list of botanical gardens and arboretums in Vermont is intended to include all significant botanical gardens and arboretums in the U.S. state of Vermont

See also
List of botanical gardens and arboretums in the United States

References 

 
Arboreta in Vermont
botanical gardens and arboretums in Vermont